Cyclone Savannah was a strong tropical cyclone that brought significant impacts to Java and Bali and minor impacts to Christmas Island and the Cocos (Keeling) Islands during March 2019. It was the sixteenth tropical low, sixth tropical cyclone and third severe tropical cyclone of the 2018–19 Australian region cyclone season. Savannah developed from a tropical low that formed well to the east of Christmas Island on 8 March. The system was slow to develop initially, but reached tropical cyclone intensity on 13 March after adopting a southwesterly track. Savannah underwent rapid intensification and reached peak intensity on 17 March as a Category 4 severe tropical cyclone on the Australian scale. One-minute sustained winds reached  at this time, equivalent to a Category 3 major hurricane on the Saffir–Simpson hurricane wind scale. Weakening commenced soon afterwards, and responsibility for the system passed from the Australian Bureau of Meteorology to Météo-France. As it moved into the new region, Savannah became the eighth of a record-breaking ten intense tropical cyclones in the 2018–19 South-West Indian Ocean cyclone season. Savannah was downgraded to a tropical depression on 20 March, and its remnants dissipated in the central Indian Ocean on 24 March.

Savannah brought significant impacts to Java and Bali early in its lifetime. Prolonged heavy rainfall and river level rise led to widespread flooding and landslides throughout the region. Floodwaters impacted scores of villages, causing damage to thousands of homes, submerging thousands of hectares of agricultural land and cutting off access to key infrastructure and services. Thousands of families were affected during the event, with evacuations occurring both before and after the flooding. According to local media reports, the total damage and economic losses caused by the disaster exceeded Rp106 billion (US$7.5 million). Ten people were reported to have died during the event, making Savannah the deadliest tropical cyclone in the Australian region since Tropical Cyclone Cempaka in 2017. News reports also indicate that at least five people were injured and that one person went missing during the disaster.

Meteorological history 

During early March, a moderate strength pulse of the Madden–Julian oscillation tracked eastwards across the tropical Indian Ocean and into the Maritime Continent. The pulse brought with it weak monsoonal conditions to the north of Australia, as well as an atmospheric environment that was favourable for tropical cyclogenesis. On 8 March, the Australian Bureau of Meteorology (BOM) noted the formation of a weak tropical low (identifier 17U) within a monsoon trough stretching from Java to the Solomon Islands—one of several tropical lows that would develop within this trough. Tracking roughly parallel to the southern coastline of Java, the system passed just to the south of Christmas Island at 06:00 UTC on 11 March, before turning to the northwest.

The tropical low executed a poleward turn on 12 March, assuming a course to the southwest by the following day. Tracking away from Indonesia, the storm began to strengthen in a generally favourable environment. The BOM upgraded the system to a Category 1 tropical cyclone on the Australian scale at 18:00 UTC on 13 March as it was approaching the Cocos (Keeling) Islands, and gave it the name Savannah. Six hours later, the United States' Joint Typhoon Warning Center (JTWC) indicated that the system had reached tropical storm strength on the Saffir-Simpson hurricane wind scale. Savannah became a Category 3 severe tropical cyclone the following day, and adopted a track to the west-southwest under the influence of a high-pressure ridge in the mid-troposphere further to the south. The storm began to strengthen quickly on 16 March, reaching peak intensity as a Category 4 severe tropical cyclone on the Australian scale at 06:00 UTC the following day, making it the then-strongest storm of the 2018–19 Australian region cyclone season.

Savannah soon began to weaken, with ten-minute sustained winds decreasing to  twelve hours later. By 00:00 UTC on 18 March, the system tracked over the 90th meridian east and into the South-West Indian Ocean cyclone region, and hence responsibility for the storm transitioned to Météo-France (MFR) at La Réunion. According to the scale used by MFR, Savannah was reclassified as a tropical cyclone. Immediately upon entering the region, increasing westerly vertical wind shear allowed dry air to become entrained in the storm's circulation. A rapid weakening trend ensued, despite the warm sea surface temperatures in the vicinity. As the convective structure weakened further, Savannah was downgraded to a gale-force remnant tropical depression at 06:00 UTC on 20 March. The system turned briefly east-southeastwards before adopting a track towards the west-northwest on 21 March. The JTWC downgraded Savannah below tropical storm status at 12:00 UTC that day. Ex-Tropical Cyclone Savannah was last mentioned by MFR on 23 March, and dissipated by 12:00 UTC the next day in the central Indian Ocean.

Impacts

Indonesia 

The Indonesian islands of Java and Bali were significantly affected by Savannah's precursor tropical low during the first half of March. Very heavy rainfall occurred across large parts of the islands as the tropical low tracked westwards, causing rapid river level rise, flooding and many landslides. A total of ten people died during the disaster, making Savannah the deadliest tropical cyclone in the Australian region since Tropical Cyclone Cempaka, which killed at least 41 people in Java in November 2017.

The Indonesian Agency for Meteorology, Climatology and Geophysics indicated that  of precipitation fell in parts of Yogyakarta during 17 March. More than 5,000 residents were forced to evacuate, and access to electricity to was cut by the floodwaters. Numerous landslides in Bantul were also triggered by the extreme rainfall, causing damage and hampering rescue and evacuation efforts. One landslide in Bantul's Imogiri district destroyed two houses at the bottom of a cliff, killing three people, and leaving one more missing. Another person was later swept away by floodwaters, and another was killed when a wall collapsed.

The economic losses that occurred in Madiun Regency were the worst in two decades, with damages and losses amounting to more than Rp54 billion (US$3.8 million), and more than 5,700 families affected by the disaster. 5,086 houses were damaged by floodwaters throughout the region, and flooding and landslides destroyed three bridges and covered many roads, impeding transportation. A car crash occurred on a wet road in Madiun, resulting in the death of a five-year-old boy and serious injuries to two adults. 497 hectares (1230 acres) of rice fields were submerged, causing crops to fail and farmers to harvest early to prevent further damage. Significant livestock losses also occurred, including cows, goats and more than 4,000 chickens. Two residents in a village in Madiun died of illness during the event, but were unable to be buried initially due to the flooding of the local cemetery.

Further damage and agricultural losses occurred in the regencies of Ngawi, Tulungagung, Bojonegoro and Ponorogo, totalling more than Rp51 billion (US$3.6 million). In Bojonegoro, flooding of the Solo River resulted in widespread impacts. Inundation occurred in 48 villages, affecting more than 1,600 families and causing 50 families to evacuate. Even after beginning to recede, the level of the Solo River was at above  in Karangnongko District, causing the Indonesian National Board for Disaster Management to issue red alerts for riverine flooding for areas further downstream. Flooding in Ponorogo from the Solo River caused five bridges to collapse, and submerged  of rice crops.

Combined damage in the regencies of Magetan, Sukoharjo, Klaten and Bulelung exceeded Rp2 billion (US$140,000). In Magetan, flooding of several rivers caused significant damage to infrastructure, agricultural land and residential areas. 100 people were stranded when nearly 500 houses were flooded in two villages, and damage to roads further inhibited access to affected areas. Losses were sustained on agricultural land, and livestock were killed by the flooding.  of rice fields were inundates in Sukoharjo, and flooding of the Gamping River in Klaten submerged  of rice fields. In Bulelung in northern Bali, heavy rainfall caused a river that was clogged with garbage and wood to overflow, damaging roads, bridges and electricity infrastructure. A government-subsidised housing complex sustained damage from the flooding, with one house being swept away by the floodwaters.

Four tourists were killed and three others were injured in Magelang Regency in central Java on 13 March. The victims had been tubing along the rapids in a river when they were overcome by flash flooding. Several villages in the Pasuruan Regency were affected by flooding, with roads and residential areas becoming inundated.

Australia 

The Australian territories of Christmas Island and the Cocos (Keeling) Islands experienced minor impacts as Savannah passed nearby. During 11 March, Savannah's precursor tropical low passed just to the south of Christmas Island. As such, no strong winds were recorded on the island. The system made its closest approach to the Cocos (Keeling) Islands on 14 March, after intensification into a Category 1 tropical cyclone. In preparation for the system's anticipated impacts on the islands, the BOM began issuing tropical cyclone advice products for residents and local authorities at 06:50 UTC on 13 March. The wind caused defoliation and vegetation damage on the islands, as well as minor damage to property, but no injuries were reported. Tropical cyclone advice publications were discontinued at 06:50 UTC on 14 March as the system tracked further away from the islands. Over the ten days from 9–18 March,  of rainfall was recorded at the Cocos (Keeling) Islands Airport on West Island, the territory's capital.

Aftermath 

Following the significant damage caused by the weather system, the Ponorogo Regency government committed to conduct dredging operations to widen the Solo River in order to mitigate future flooding impacts. The government also indicated that they would attempt to quickly rebuild damaged bridges through a special allocation of budget resources for the disaster response. Additionally, residents were urged to refrain from disposing of rubbish in the river, as it was noted that this could exacerbate the risk and impacts of flooding. Significant rubbish pollution resulting in river clogging was also observed in the Bulelung Regency in Bali, where it was regarded as a contributing factor to the flooding.

The East Java government allocated Rp100 billion (US$7.1 million) in funding for local governments that declared states of emergency in their local regions due to flooding. The money was intended to cover logistics, equipment, human resources and other necessities for disaster relief and cleanup efforts. Farmers who were affected by the disaster were also able to access Rp6 million (US$420) in compensation from local governments for every hectare (2.5 acres) of damaged agricultural land on their property.

See also 

 Weather of 2019
 Tropical cyclones in 2019
Severe Tropical Cyclone Oscar–Itseng (2004)—originated in the Australian region and took a similar track to Savannah
Cyclone Cempaka (2017)—a weak tropical cyclone that killed at least 41 people in Java during November 2017
Severe Tropical Cyclone Ernie (2017)—took a similar track to Savannah
Intense Tropical Cyclone Kenanga—originated in the Australian region and tracked into the South-West Indian Ocean region

Notes

References

External links 

Australian Bureau of Meteorology
Météo-France at La Réunion (in French)
Indonesian Agency for Meteorology, Climatology and Geophysics (in Indonesian)
Joint Typhoon Warning Center
Official severe weather report on Severe Tropical Cyclone Savannah

Tropical cyclones in 2019
2018–19 Australian region cyclone season
2018–19 South-West Indian Ocean cyclone season
Tropical cyclones in Indonesia
Tropical cyclones in Western Australia
Category 4 Australian region cyclones
Intense Tropical Cyclones
Floods in Indonesia